Jai Bhole is 2018 Nepalese drama romance film, directed by Ashok Sharma and written by Khagendra Lamichhane. The film is produced by Kiran Sharma, Kriti Sharma, and Ankit Sharma under the banner of AA Group of Companies. The film stars Khagendra Lamichhane, Saugat Malla, Swastima Khadka, Buddhi Tamang, and Salon Basnet in the lead roles.

Plot

Cast 

 Khagendra Lamichhane as Jai
 Saugat Malla as Bhole
 Swastima Khadka as Nisha
 Salon Basnet as Shamsher
 Buddhi Tamang as Bruce Lee (a parody of Bruce Lee)
 Rajaram Paudel as Jai's father

Soundtrack

References

External links 

 

Nepalese romantic drama films
2010s Nepali-language films
Films shot in Jhapa
Films shot in Ilam
2018 romantic drama films